Ignacio or Nacho Sánchez may refer to:

 Ignacio Sánchez Mejías (1891-1934), Spanish bullfighter
 Nacho Sánchez Amor (born 1960), member of the European Parliament
 Ignacio Sánchez-Cuenca (born 1966), Spanish social scientist
 Ignacio Sánchez Barrera (born 1972), Mexican footballer
 Ignacio Sánchez (volleyball player) (born 1991), volleyball player
 Nacho Sánchez (actor) (born 1992), Spanish actor
 Nacho (footballer, born 1993), Spanish footballer